Arthur Griffin (3 June 1871 – 1945) was an English footballer who played in the Football League for Walsall and Wolverhampton Wanderers.

References

1871 births
1945 deaths
English footballers
Association football forwards
English Football League players
Brierley Hill Alliance F.C. players
Walsall F.C. players
Wolverhampton Wanderers F.C. players
FA Cup Final players